Beyti is a Turkish dish consisting of ground beef or lamb, grilled on a skewer and served wrapped in lavash and topped with tomato sauce and yogurt.

The dish is named after Beyti Güler, the owner of the popular restaurant Beyti in Istanbul. He was inspired to create his own dish in 1961 after witnessing Swiss butcher Möller's method of preparing meat, when he was visiting Switzerland. His version consists of lamb fillets wrapped in strips of cutlet fat, and grilled. The dish of ground meat commonly sold as street food under this name, bears little resemblance to his original.

See also 

 List of lamb dishes
 List of kebabs

References 

Middle Eastern grilled meats
Skewered kebabs
Turkish words and phrases
Beef dishes
Lamb dishes